Adair is a town in Mayes County, Oklahoma, United States. The population was 790 at the 2010 census, compared to the figure of 704 recorded in 2000. Named for two prominent Cherokee brothers, the town was established in 1883. It opened a Cherokee school.

History
Adair is named after two Cherokee brothers, William Penn Adair, a politician and jurist, and Dr. Walter Thompson Adair. It was established on March 15, 1883, and incorporated in 1897. William Penn Adair lived in the area off and on for 17 years beginning in the late 1860s.

In the 1880s, a Cherokee school was started here. In 1907, shortly before statehood, the school began to admit white students.

Dalton Gang Train Robbery
In the most daring deed of the Dalton Gang to date, on July 14, 1892, eight members held up the Missouri-Kansas-Texas train at Adair, Indian Territory (IT).

As the train approached, four men approached the night operator at the station and ordered him to "flag down" the train. As the train pulled to a stand-still, two members of the gang boarded the engine while the others covered the conductor and train men. The station operator was taken to the express car, where he ordered the messenger inside to open up. When the messenger refused, the train's fireman was ordered to break open the door with his pick. Once inside, the bandits were quick to rifle the safe of its contents.

The gang did not know that a special detachment of eight railroad guards was on the train, in an effort to prevent such robberies. In command was J. J. Kinney, chief of railroad detectives, and Capt. J. H. LaFlore, chief of the Cherokee Nation police. Realizing the robbery was underway, the guards got off the train opposite the depot, and had a brief gun battle with some of the bandits on that side.

Finished on the train, the bandits made their get-away through the town. Doctors W. L. Goff and Youngblood were sitting on the porch of the drug store near the depot. Both men were hit several times by stray shots; Dr Goff was fatally wounded. Also wounded were captains Kinney and LaFlore, but they recovered.

The railroad and express company offered rewards of $5,000 "for the capture and conviction" for each bandit in the robbery.

Geography
The city is in the northeastern portion of the state known as "Green Country" and is near the borders of Kansas, Missouri, and Arkansas.

Churches
There are many churches in the greater Adair area. Within the town boundaries are Adair United Methodist Church, First Baptist Church of Adair, and Adair Christian Church.

Climate
Adair has more sunny days than the average U.S. city and a great deal less snowfall. Late spring is the wettest time of the year for the city, while winter is the driest.

Demographics

As of the 2010 census, Adair had a population of 790.  The population density was 180 people per square mile (68/km).  The town's 315 housing units were dispersed at an average density of 70 per square mile (27/km).  The racial and ethnic composition of the population was 72.4% white, 0.1% black or African American, 18.9% Native American, 0.6% reporting some other race and 8.0% reporting two or more races. 3.5% of the population was Hispanic or Latino.

There were 272 households, out of which 36.8% had children under the age of 18 living with them, 57.7% were married couples living together, 12.1% had a female householder with no husband present, and 26.8% were non-families. 23.2% of all households were made up of individuals, and 8.5% had someone living alone who was 65 years of age or older. The average household size was 2.59 and the average family size was 3.06.

In the town, the population was spread out, with 27.6% under the age of 18, 10.8% from 18 to 24, 26.1% from 25 to 44, 23.4% from 45 to 64, and 12.1% who were 65 years of age or older. The median age was 34 years. For every 100 females, there were 90.3 males. For every 100 females age 18 and over, there were 91.7 males.

The median income for a household in the town was $35,250, and the median income for a family was $38,500. Males had a median income of $31,313 versus $17,500 for females. The per capita income for the town was $14,388. About 10.5% of families and 12.3% of the population were below the poverty line, including 22.2% of those under age 18 and 2.8% of those age 65 or over.

Education
Adair is served by the Adair Independent School District.

Notable people 
 William Penn Adair, leader, politician and jurist of the Cherokee Nation, lived here for much of 17 years
 Evelyn Varden (1893-1958), was born here. She became a film and stage actress (The Bad Seed, The Night of the Hunter)
 Austin Ben Tincup, Born Adair, I.T.(April 14, 1893 – July 5, 1980) was a pitcher in Major League Baseball from 1914 to 1928. His career was interrupted during his service in World War I.

See also
Samuel Houston Mayes

References

External links
 Encyclopedia of Oklahoma History and Culture - Adair

Towns in Mayes County, Oklahoma
Towns in Oklahoma
Cherokee towns in Oklahoma
Populated places established in 1883